The Loop C Comfort Station and the Loop D Comfort Station are public toilet facilities in Bryce Canyon National Park's North Campground, individually listed on the National Register of Historic Places in 1995 for their significance as structures relating to the park's administrative infrastructure, and for their integrity as examples of rustic architecture. The National Park Service rustic style structures were built in 1935 as part of the first planned campground in the park by Civilian Conservation Corps labor. Plans were developed by the National Park Service Branch of Plans and Designs. Similar facilities in Loops A and B were not built until the 1950s.

The comfort stations are rectangular log buildings of one story. The logs are saddle-notched. The interior has separate facilities for men and women, separated by a utility room. The gable roof is covered with wood shakes. Rafter ends are exposed.  The original chopper-cut log ends have been cut down flat.

The comfort stations were individually listed on the National Register of Historic Places on April 25, 1995.  The entire campground was considered for eligibility, but retains little historic integrity apart from the two comfort stations.

References

Government buildings completed in 1934
National Register of Historic Places in Bryce Canyon National Park
Civilian Conservation Corps in Utah
Park buildings and structures on the National Register of Historic Places in Utah
Restrooms in the United States
Rustic architecture in Utah
National Register of Historic Places in Garfield County, Utah
1934 establishments in Utah